Motivation High School is a district-run magnet high school in Southwest Philadelphia. Originally this was an annex of John Bartram High School for over three decades as Bartram Motivation. Subsequently, the school was located in the former Thomas Buchanan Read School before being moved to the John P. Turner Middle School building in 2013. Motivation is a liberal arts preparatory school.

External links

Motivation High School Website
Motivation High School: School Profile

Notes

Motivation High School
School District of Philadelphia
Motivation High School
Public high schools in Pennsylvania